Akira Miyoshi (三善　晃; January 10, 1933 – 4 October 2013) was a Japanese composer.

Biography
Miyoshi was born in Suginami, Tokyo. He was a child prodigy on the piano, studying with Kozaburo Hirai and Tomojiro Ikenouchi. He studied French literature at the University of Tokyo, and then studied composition with Henri Challan and Raymond Gallois-Montbrun at the Paris Conservatory from 1955 to 1957. He was very influenced by Henri Dutilleux. He returned to Japan in 1957 and graduated from the University of Tokyo in 1960. In 1965, he became a professor at the Toho Gakuen School of Music. In 1996, Miyoshi was awarded the Officier de l’Ordre des Arts et des Lettres from the French Government. In 1999, he received the 31st Suntory Music Award. He received the Otaka prize six times for his compositions.

Works

Orchestral 
 1960 Trois mouvements symphoniques – (Kôkyô sanshô)
 1962 Concerto for piano and orchestra
 1964 Duel for soprano and orchestra
 1964 Concerto for Orchestra
 1965 Concerto for violin and orchestra
 1969 Concerto for marimba and string ensemble
 1969 Odes métamorphosées
 1970 Festival Overture
 1970 Requiem for mixed choir and orchestra
 1974 Concerto for cello and orchestra
 1978 Noesis
 1979 Psaume for mixed choir and orchestra
 1982 En-Soi Lointain
 1984 Kyômon for children's choir and orchestra
 1988 Litania pour Fuji
 1991 Création sonore
 1991 Etoiles à cordes
 1995 Dispersion de l'été
 1996 Étoile à échos for cello and orchestra
 1997 Fruits de brume
 1998 Chanson terminale: Effeuillage des Vagues

Works for wind orchestra 
 1972 Sapporo Olympic Fanfare
 1987 Subliminal Festa – (Secret Rites)
 1990 Stars Atlanpic '96
 1991 Cross-By March
 2000 Millennium Fanfare
 2002 West Wind (timpani concerto)

Chamber music 
 1954 Violin Sonata
 1955 Sonata for flute, cello and piano
 1962 String Quartet No. 1
 1967 String Quartet No. 2
 1969 Huit poèmes for flute octet
 1973 Nocturne for flute, clarinet, marimba, double bass and percussion
 1975 Litania for double bass and percussion
 1979 Hommage for flute, violin and piano
 1980 Ixtacchihuatl for percussion ensemble
 1982 Rêve colorie for two clarinets
 1985 Message Sonore for flute, clarinet, marimba, double bass and percussion
 1987 C6H for cello
 1989 Ombre Scintillante for flute and harp
 1989 Perspective en Spirale for clarinet and piano
 1990 5 Esquisses for tuba and marimba
 1992 String Quartet No. 3: Constellation Noire

Music for piano 
 1958 Piano Sonata
 1960 Suite In Such Time
 1973 Chaînes Prelude for piano
 1980 En vers for piano
 1981 A Diary of the Sea (28 pieces)
 1984 Phenomene sonore I for two pianos
 1985 Cahier sonore for four-hand piano
 1995 Phenomene sonore II for two pianos
 1998 Pour le piano – mouvement circulaire et croisé

Music for guitar 
 1974 Protase "de loin à rien" for two guitars
 1975 Epitase
 1985 5 Poèmes
 1989 Constellation Noire for guitar and string quartet

Music for Percussion 
 1962 Conversation – Suite for marimba
 Tender Talk
 So Nice It Was...Repeatedly
 Lingering Chagrin
 Again The Hazy Answer!
 A Lame Excuse
 1965 Torse III for marimba
 These
 Chant
 Commentaire
 Synthese
 1977 Étude Concertante for 2 marimbas
 1987 Rin-sai for marimba solo and six percussion players
 1991 Ripple for marimba solo
 2001 Prelude Etudes for marimba

Music for traditional Japanese instruments 
 1972 Torse IV for shakuhachi, 2 koto, 17-gen and string quartet
 1986 Ryusho Kyoku Suifu for shakuhachi, 2 koto und 17-gen
 1994 Gikyoku for Japanese instruments

Songs 
 1962 En blanc for soprano and piano
 1962 Sei sanryoh hari for soprano and piano
 1991 Koeru Kage ni for soprano and piano

Choral music 
 1962 Three Lyrics (Mittsu no Jojoh) for women's choir and piano
 1962 To my married Daughter for mixed choir
 1966 Four Seasons for mixed choir
 1968 Five Pictures for Children for mixed choir and piano
 The weathercock
 The trumpet-shell
 "Yajiro-be" – A balancing toy
 The sand-glass
 A top of acorn
 1970 Ohson fuki (Ohson didn't come back) for men's choir and piano
 1971 Four Autumn Songs for women's choir and piano
 1972 Odeko no koitsu for children's choir and piano
 1973 5 Japanese Folksongs for mixed choir
 Awa odori
 Sado Okesa
 Kiso bushi
 Soran bushi
 Itsuki no komoriuta
 1973 Otewanmiso no uta for mixed choir
 1975 Hengetan'ei for mixed choir, shakuhachi, percussion instrument and 17-gen
 1976 Kitsune-no-uta (Song of Fox) for children's choir, speaker, and piano
 1978 Klee no ehon dai1shū (Klee's Picture book No.1) for mixed choir and guitar
 1979 Klee no ehon dai2shū (Klee's Picture book No.2) for men's choir
 1982 Norainu Doji for women's choir and piano
 1983 Ballades to the Earth for mixed choir
 1983 Poems of Animals for mixed choir and piano
 1984 Poems of Animals for women's choir and piano
 1984 Collection of songs "Died in the Country" for mixed choir and two pianos
 1985 Letters To God for children's choir and marimba
 1987 Umi (The Sea) for mixed choir and two pianos
 1991 Yamagara Diary for children's choir, sanukite and marimba
 1992 Asakura Sanka for speaker, mixed choir, Japanese flute and Taiko
 1996 Kamuy no kaze (Wind of Kamuy) for mixed choir and piano
 2007 The Day - August 6 for mixed choir and piano

Stage works 
Incomplete list:
 1959 Ondine, opera
 1999 Faraway Sail, opera

Anime music 
 Anne of Green Gables

Books and writings 
 Akira Miyoshi: The Silent Beat of Japanese Music, in Japanese Essences (Japan as I see it – 3) Shichi Yamamoto, Kenichi Fukui et al., Tokyo. 1985.
 Yoko Narasaki: Toru Takemitsu to Akira Miyoshi no Sakkyoku Yoshiki (The Style of Composition of Toru Takemitsu and Akira Miyoshi). Tokyo: Ongaku no Tomosha, 1994.

External links 

Akira Miyoshi - List of Works
Akira Miyoshi (TOKYO CONCERTS)

References

1933 births
2013 deaths
20th-century classical composers
20th-century Japanese composers
20th-century Japanese male musicians
21st-century classical composers
21st-century Japanese composers
21st-century Japanese male musicians
Academic staff of Toho Gakuen School of Music
Concert band composers
Conservatoire de Paris alumni
Composers for the classical guitar
Japanese classical composers
Japanese classical guitarists
Japanese male classical composers
Japanese opera composers
Male opera composers
People from Suginami